Keerthi, also spelled Keerthy or Kirti, is an Indian feminine given name. It may refer to:

 Keerthi Pasquel, (born 1956), singer
 Keerthi Ranasinghe (born 1962), cricketer
 Keerthi Reddy (born 1977), Indian actress
 Keerthi Sagathia (born 1979), singer
 Keerthi Chawla (born 1981), Indian actress
 Keerthy Suresh (born 1992), Indian actress
 Keerthi Bhat (born 1999), Indian actress

Indian feminine given names